Lake Wahtopanah, also known as Rivers Reservoir, is a lake on the Little Saskatchewan River near the town of Rivers, Manitoba. Its dam was built by the Prairie Farm Rehabilitation Administration in 1960 to supplement water supplies for irrigation. It also provides the water supply for the town of Rivers, stock watering and recreation. Riparian flows are regulated by a four-foot square gated conduit. The province maintains a park and campground on the west shore.
The name is an alternate form of the Native word watopapinah meaning "canoe people".

In late June and early July 2020, the area received a 1 in 1000 year runoff event; the flow peaked at about 300 cms (10600 cfs) . The area received over 20 inches of rain over a 5-day period causing the lake to flood to the never before seen level of 471.02 meters (1545.35 feet above sea level), 2.85 meters (9.35 feet) above the full supply level. This also caused the Manitoba Government to lose confidence in the dam and to warn everyone down stream of the likelihood of dam failure and catastrophic flooding. It caused nearby  municipalities and the City of Brandon to declare states of emergency and the City of Brandon to put over 2000 residents on evacuation notice. Several near by cabins, homes, and campers in seasonal campground were lost. 
Once the flood waters receded, the province was able to assess the dam and regain confidence in the structure.

References

Lakes of Manitoba
Reservoirs in Canada